Marist Place is the former location of a school building at today's 123 East Charlton Street in Savannah, Georgia, United States, in the southwest tything of Lafayette Square. It was located in what became Savannah's Historic District.

The building was home to the Marist School for Boys between 1919 and 1939. 

A plaque on the building, erected June 9, 1989, by Colonel Joseph B. Bergen, Class of 1939, reads:

Gallery

References

External links

Marist Place - Historical Marker Database
View of the rear of the property from East Charlton Lane, Google Street View

Lafayette Square (Savannah) buildings